The holy village "Hegde" is surrounded by Sahyadri ranges which is located on the bank of River Aghanashini in Uttara Kannada district, 4 kilometers away from Kumta Taluk. Here the temple of Gramadevata Shri Shantika Devi, Shri Hirebeera have existed even before 14th century AD. This is a holy religious place, where Shakti deities are showering their powers of blessings on eighteen villages and on the Bhaktas who live in the villages and abroad. Hegde is a holy place of deities Shri Hirebeera who is the grama deva and other devas are Shri Veerabhadra, Shri Shoolabeera, Shri Bagilabeera, Shri Bhandarabeera and its arivara devas are Shri Mahasati, Shri Gramapurusha, Shri Nana Bhoota, Shri Mungalu Vyagrah Devate, Shri Vyagrah Chandika Devate, Shri Kendada Mahasati and Shri Naga Bhana.

Speciality of Deities During Car Festival 

In those days only "Bhandi" festival (Eleven Kalasha's Festival) was celebrated. Even now the "Panchotsava" and car festival is being celebrated by the purohitas of the temple and the villagers as per the instructions given by the Swamiji of Uppunda (Uppugunda) matha in the olden days. Even today car festival has its own speciality. It begins from Pushya full moon astami and continues for almost 21 days and it ends on Pushya new moon trayodashi. Every day car festival begins at Shri Veerabhadra temple and all celebrations are performed at Shri Shantika Devi, Shri Hirebeera temple and ends in Shri Veerabhadra Temple only. The great car festival will take place on Pushya new moon (Pushya Bahula) dwadashi. It is believed that when a childless British officer prayed to these Gods, he was blessed with a child and as a gratitude he donated a great chariot to this temple. During Shri Hirebeera Kalashotsava the Patri will have conversation with the deities and have discussion about welfare of the village, regarding diseases, rains, crops etc. And he instruct the head man of the village by name "Hegade" regarding pooja’s and offering to be given to the parivara devatas and gives his blessings by giving prasadam to him for the welfare and peace of the village. During the participation in this festival one feels that he is witnessing a unique enchanting moment.

Glory (Mahima of this Place) 

Maha Tapasvi and Maha Maheem Shri Shri Shri Shridhara Swamiji travelled to different places and gave his blessings to the common people there. Later he came to this holy place, with his inner consciousness he said that Shri Hirebeera and his clan deities are very powerful. In this holy place one of the Thrimoorthies lord Shiva, took the form of Rudhra Shakti as Shri Hirebeera, facing towards the south. Shri Shridhara Maha Maheem Swamiji narrated that whoever worshipped him will be blessed and will be fulfilled by all needs. He re-installed the idol of Shri Mungalu Vyagrah Devate and showered his blessings for the development of this holy place.

Hindu temples in Uttara Kannada district